Emoia callisticta is a species of lizard in the family Scincidae. It is found in Indonesia.

References

Emoia
Reptiles described in 1878
Reptiles of Indonesia
Endemic fauna of Indonesia
Taxa named by Wilhelm Peters
Taxa named by Giacomo Doria